Chambal may refer to:
 Chambal division, in the state of Madhya Pradesh in India
 Chambal River, flows through the Chambal division
 Chambal (film), a 2019 Indian Kannada thriller film